Route nationale 5a (RN 5a) is a secondary highway in Madagascar of 406 km, running from Ambilobe to Antalaha. It crosses the regions of Diana and Sava. 

The section from Ambilobe to Vohemar was completely unpaved and in very bad condition until 2020 when important road works had been undertaken. This part of the route had been paved in September 2022.
From Vohemar to Antalaha the road is paved and in good condition.

Selected locations on route
(north to south)
Ambilobe - (intersection with RN 6 to Antsiranana and Ambondromamy)
Daraina (75 km)
Vohemar (152 km)
Sambava (303 km - intersection with RN 3b to Andapa)
Antalaha

Gallery

See also
List of roads in Madagascar
Transport in Madagascar

References

Roads in Diana Region
Roads in Sava
Roads in Madagascar